James Wesley "Jay" Huguely (September 21, 1940 – December 13, 2008) was an American stage actor, singer, advertising executive, and television writer and executive who enjoyed a brief run of popularity as a novelty recording artist in the 1970s, recording as Cledus Maggard & the Citizen's Band. He worked for Leslie Advertising in Greenville, South Carolina and enjoyed his only hit in 1976 with "The White Knight", released during the wave of popularity of the citizens' band radio. The song is about a truck driver victimized by a Georgia highway patrolman's speed trap. He chose the name "Cledus" after his mother's name Cleta.

"The White Knight" reached No. 1 on the Billboard magazine Hot Country Singles chart in February 1976, and was his only hit to reach that chart's Top 40. Following the success of this record, Huguely was a producer on the 1980s television series Magnum, P.I.. In the 1990s, he was a writer and producer, known for Jason Goes to Hell: The Final Friday (1993), Street Justice (1991), and Bandit: Bandit's Silver Angel (1994).

Huguely died in Valencia, California on December 13, 2008, at the age of 68.

Discography

Albums

Singles

References

1940 births
2008 deaths
American country singer-songwriters
People from Richmond, Kentucky
Mercury Records artists
Country musicians from Kentucky
Singer-songwriters from Kentucky
20th-century American singers